Central Telephone Company is a telephone operating company owned by Lumen Technologies that provides local telephone service in Florida, Nevada, and North Carolina. Its largest market is Las Vegas

History
The company was established in 1971 as a subsidiary of Centel.  In 1992, Centel was acquired by Sprint, but the Central Telephone Company retained its corporate name.  In 2006, Sprint spun off its local telephone business as Embarq, which was then acquired by CenturyTel (now CenturyLink) in 2009.

Proposed sale of North Carolina assets
On August 3, 2021, Lumen announced its sale of its local telephone assets in 20 states to Apollo Global Management, including North Carolina. Lumen will continue to provide ILEC services in Florida and Nevada.

References

See also
Centel
CenturyLink

American companies established in 1971
Telecommunications companies established in 1971
Lumen Technologies
Sprint Corporation
Communications in Nevada
Communications in North Carolina
Telecommunications companies of the United States